Vexillum angustissimum is a species of small sea snail, marine gastropod mollusk in the family Costellariidae, the ribbed miters.

Description
The length of the shell varies between 13 mm and 17 mm.

This species is remarkable for its very slender form and the punctate striae between the ribs. The folds on the columella correspond to the oblique ridges between the sulci on the cauda of the body 
whorl. These ridges are spotted with pale brown.

Distribution
This marine species occurs in the Indo-Pacific; also off Australia (Northern Territory, Queensland, Western Australia)

References

 Cernohorsky, W.O. 1970. Systematics of the families Mitridae & Volutomitridae (Mollusca: Gastropoda). Bulletin of the Auckland Institute and Museum. Auckland, New Zealand 8: 1-190
 Cernohorsky, W.O. 1978. Tropical Pacific marine shells. Sydney : Pacific Publications 352 pp., 68 pls. 
 Wilson, B. 1994. Australian marine shells. Prosobranch gastropods. Kallaroo, WA : Odyssey Publishing Vol. 2 370 pp.
 Wils, E. & Verbinnen, G. 2002. Red Sea Mollusca: Part 12. Class Gastropoda; Family: Costellariidae. Gloria Maris 41(1-2): 29-37 
 Poppe G.T., Guillot de Suduiraut E. & Tagaro S.P. (2006) New Costellariidae from the Philippines. Visaya 1(6): 104–113. 
 Spencer, H.; Marshall. B. (2009). All Mollusca except Opisthobranchia. In: Gordon, D. (Ed.) (2009). New Zealand Inventory of Biodiversity. Volume One: Kingdom Animalia. 584 pp

External links
Smith E.A. (1903). Marine Mollusca. In: J.S. Gardiner (ed.), 1901-1906. The fauna and geography of the Maldive and Laccadive archipelagoes: being an account of the work carried on and of the collections made by an expedition during the years 1899 and 1900. 2(2): 589-630, pls 35-36.

angustissimum
Gastropods described in 1903